Anniversary Anthems is a studio album by the English punk rock band Toy Dolls, recorded in 2000.

Track listing 
All compositions by Michael Algar except where noted.

 "The Anniversary Waltz" (Dubin, Franklin) – 1:13
 "My Baby Is a Battleaxe" – 2:43
 "Her with a Hoover" – 2:29
 "Alec's Back" – 2:32
 "Dorkamania" – 2:26
 "Audreys Alone At Last" – 2:39
 "Eine Kleine Nacht Muzik" – 3:05
 "Charlies Watching" – 3:18
 "I Wish My Eyes Were Ernies" – 2:37
 "Livin' on Newton Hall" – 2:51
 "What She Had with Huey" – 2:57
 "I've Had Enough O'magaluf" – 3:07
 "Livin la Vida Loca (Ricky Martin cover)" (Rosa, Child) – 3:24
 "The Anniversary Waltz" (Dubin, Franklin) – 1:12
 "We're 21 Today" – 0:18

Personnel 
 Michael "Olga" Algar - vocals, guitar
 Gary "Gary Fun" Dunn - bass, vocals
 Martin "Marty" Yule - drums, vocals

References

External links 
 Album page on The Toy Dolls website

Toy Dolls albums
2000 albums